Peter York (born 15 August 1942 in Redcar, Yorkshire, England) is a British rock drummer who has been performing since the 1960s.

Biography
Born in Redcar, he attended the Nottingham High School and learnt to play the trumpet and snare drum in a school band, he also attended Trent College. Upon leaving school he embarked on a commercial apprenticeship.

He was one of the original members of the Spencer Davis Group, along with Spencer Davis and the brothers Steve and Muff Winwood. York stayed with the band until 1969.

He left the Spencer Davis Group to form Hardin and York with Eddie Hardin.

They played as Hardin York at Rockpalast.

Eric Clapton's Powerhouse was a short lived blues band in 1966.  It starred Eric Clapton (guitar), and featured Paul Jones (harmonica) and Jack Bruce (bass), Steve Winwood (vocals) with York (drums), and Ben Palmer (piano).

Under the name of The Blueshounds (with Roger Hill, guitar, and Graham Gallery, bass) he backed New Orleans singer and piano player Cousin Joe on his 1974 album "Soul-shouting Bluesman from New Orleans" (Big Bear Records).

In the 80s he fronted an all-star band called Olympic Rock & Blues Circus featuring a rotating line-up of the likes of Jon Lord, Miller Anderson, Tony Ashton, Brian Auger, Zoot Money, Colin Hodgkinson, Chris Farlowe and many others. Olympic Rock & Blues Circus toured primarily in Germany, in 1981/82 and 1989, and also appeared sporadically in the UK under the name Endangered Species.

In February 1987, York started his first series of "Superdrumming" featuring Ian Paice, Louie Bellson, Cozy Powell, Gerry Brown and Simon Phillips.

The next year, 1988, the second series of "Superdrumming" featured Billy Cobham, Bill Bruford, Dave Mattacks, Zak Starkey, Nicko McBrain, Jon Lord and Eddie Hardin.

The third series of "Superdrumming" featured Jon Hiseman, Steve Ferrone, Mark Brzezicki, Trilok Gurtu and the return of Ian Paice.
The band on this series featured Miller Anderson, Colin Hodgkinson, Brian Auger, Jon Lord and Barbara Thompson.

In 1989, Brian Auger was musical director for the thirteen-part film retrospective series Villa Fantastica, made for German TV. A live recording of the series, Super Jam (1990), featured Brian Auger on piano, York on drums, Dick Morrissey on tenor saxophone, Roy Williams on trombone, Harvey Weston on bass guitar, plus the singers Zoot Money and Maria Muldaur.

In 1990, the fourth series of "Superdrumming" was held in Freiburg, Germany with drummers Ian Paice, Jon Hiseman, Cozy Powell and York.

York has played drums for German entertainer and jazz musician Helge Schneider several times since 2004, both on Schneider's recordings and on tour. York also acted in Schneider's film Jazzclub.

York participated in the 'Drum Legends' project with Herman Rarebell, where they released a live CD and DVD along with jazz drummer Charly Antolini.

Discography

With The Spencer Davis Group
 Their First LP (1965)
 The Second Album (1966)
 Autumn '66 (1966)
 Gimme Some Lovin''' (1967)
 I'm A Man (1967)
 Here We Go Round the Mulberry Bush (1968, with Traffic)
 Heavies (1969)
 With Their New Face On (1968)
 Gluggo (1973)
 Living in a Back Street (1974)
 Catch You on the Rebop – Live in Europe '73 (1995)
 Somebody Help Me: The Best of 1964–1968 (2001) 
 Live in Manchester 2002 (2002)

With Hardin & York
  Tomorrow Today Bell SBLL125 (1969)
  The World's Smallest Big Band Bell SBLL136 (1970)
  For The World  Bell SBLL141 (1971)
  Hardin & York with Charlie McCracken  Vertigo 6360622 (1974)
  Hardin & New York  Teldec 624595 (1979)
  Live At The Marquee 1971 RPM RPM135 (1994)
  Hardin & York Live Repertoire REP 4459-WY (1994) 1970 recording, previously a bootleg
  Still A Few Pages Left RPM Thunderbird CSA 106 (1995)

Reissues
  For The World  See For Miles (1985)
  Tomorrow Today Repertoire REP 4481-WY (1994)
  World Smallest Big Band  Repertoire REP 4482-WY (1994)

Other recordings
 Nazareth – Nazareth (1971)
 Jon Lord – Windows (1974)
 Eddie Playboy Taylor & The Blueshounds – Ready for Eddie (1975)
 Jon Lord – Sarabande (1976) 
 Rick Sanders/Pete York/Steve Richardson – String Time (1983)
 Pete York/"Wolfhound" Wolfgang Schmid/Lenny Mac Dowell – Once Upon A Time... Der Rattenfänger Von Hameln (1983)
 Pete York/"Wolfhound" Wolfgang Schmid/Lenny Mac Dowell – Wireless (1984)
 Spencer Davis/Pete York/Colin Hodgkinson – Live Together (1985)
 Brian Auger/Pete York/Colin Hodgkinson – Steaming (1985)
 Chris Farlowe/Spencer Davis/Pete York/Colin Hodgkinson/Zoot Money/Miller Anderson – Extremely Live At Birmingham Town Hall (1988)
 Jon Lord – Pictured Within (1998) 
 Jon Lord – Beyond the Notes (2004)
 GoodTimes-All-Star-Band – Good Times Songs  (2009)
 Helge und Band – Komm Hier Haste Ne Mark! Live (2011)
 Jon Lord Blues Project – Live (2011)

Solo projects
 The Pete York Percussion Band – The Pete York Percussion Band (1972)
 Pete York's New York – Into the Furnace (1980)
 Pete York's New York – What's the Racket (1981)
 Olympic Rock & Blues Circus – Olympic Rock & Blues Circus (1981)
 Open Road (1981)
 Pete York's New York – Pete York's New York (1983)
 Super Drumming Vol. 1 (1987)
 Super Drumming Vol. 2 (1989)
 Super Drumming Vol. 3 (1990)
 String Time in New York (1990)Superblues (1994)Swinging Hollywood (1994)
 Pete York's Blue Jive Five – Live – Listen Here! (1996)
 Pete York's Blue Jive Five – Live – Second Set (1998)
 Pete York Jazz Stars – Live & Swinging (1998)
 The Pete York Percussion Band – Extension 345 – Live 1974 (2005)
 Herman Rarebell/Pete York/Charly Antolini – Drum Legends – Live 2005 (2007)
 Pete York & Young Friends – Basiecally Speaking'' (2013)

References

External links

Pete York at Drummerworld.com

Biography at Drumsoloartist.com

1942 births
English rock drummers
British male drummers
English session musicians
People from Redcar
Living people
British rhythm and blues boom musicians
ACT Music artists
The Spencer Davis Group members
Eric Clapton and the Powerhouse members